The Swedish national American football team is the official American football team for Sweden. They came Third place in the first American Football World Cup in 1999, did not participate in 2003, and came in fourth in 2007. They are members of the European Federation of American Football.

Results

IFAF World Championship record

European Championships
 1983 : 
 1985 : 
 1987 : 
 1989 : 
 1991 : 
 1993 : 
 1995 : 
 1997 :  Runner-up
 2000 : Did not qualify
 2001 : 
 2005 :  Champions
 2010: Fourth place
 2014: Fifth place
 2018: Fourth place
 2021 :  Runner-up

External links

Sweden
American Football
American football in Sweden
1984 establishments in Sweden
American football teams established in 1984